Kevin W. Parke is an American lawyer and business executive.  He is best known as President of the Todd Wagner Foundation.

Biography
Kevin Parke was born in Wilmington, Delaware, USA, in May 1959, the oldest son of Lowell W. Parke and Lois A. Parke.  Parke attended Alexis I duPont High School, graduating in 1977.  Parke attended Vanderbilt University in Nashville, where he received a Bachelor of Arts degree in Economics and Psychology in 1981.  He subsequently received a J.D. degree in 1985 from Southern Methodist University in University Park, Texas. He began his legal career with Akin Gump Strauss Hauer & Feld in Dallas, Texas. He later became a corporate partner with the law firm Hopkins & Sutter.

Parke left full-time law practice and eventually joined a start-up company, AudioNet, where he was responsible for all broadcast operations, streaming technology and business development.  AudioNet was renamed Broadcast.com in 1998 shortly before its initial public offering.  That company was acquired by Yahoo! in 1999 for $5.7 billion.  Following that merger, Parke became vice-president and general manager of Yahoo! Broadcast.  Parke left Yahoo! in 2003 to join Broadcast.com co-founder Todd Wagner's private foundation as President.  In addition to his role with the Todd Wagner Foundation, Parke was executive vice president of the Wagner/Cuban Companies. and president of Landmark Theatres, which operated up to 70 theatres in 23 markets.  Parke joined 2M Capital Management in 2011 as operating partner for several of its portfolio investments including Alpha Dominche Ltd. and Altior.

References

Living people
American businesspeople
1959 births
Vanderbilt University alumni